The first world record in the 100 metres butterfly in long course (50 metres) swimming was recognised by the International Swimming Federation (FINA) in 1957, for both men and women. In the short-course (25 metres) swimming events, the world's governing body recognizes world records since March 3, 1991.

Men

Long course

Short course

Women

Long course

Short course

All-time top 25

Men long course
Correct as of July 2022

Notes
Below is a list of other times equal or superior to 50.92:
Caeleb Dressel also swam 49.50 (2019), 49.66 (2019), 49.71 (2021), 49.76 (2021), 49.86 (2017), 49.87 (2021), 50.01 (2022), 50.07 (2017), 50.08 (2017), 50.17 (2021), 50.20 (2022), 50.28 (2019), 50.36 (2019), 50.39 (2021), 50.50 (2018), 50.75 (2018), 50.87 (2017), 50.92 (2020).
Milorad Čavić also swam 50.01 (2009), 50.56 (2009), 50.59 (2008), 50.76 (2008), 50.92 (2008).
Kristóf Milák also swam 50.14 (2022, 2022), 50.18 (2021), 50.31 (2021), 50.33 (2022), 50.47 (2021), 50.62 (2017, 2021, 2021), 50.64 (2021), 50.68 (2022), 50.77 (2017), 50.89 (2021).
Michael Phelps also swam 50.22 (2009), 50.45 (2015), 50.48 (2009, 2009), 50.58 (2008), 50.65 (2010), 50.71 (2011), 50.77 (2007), 50.86 (2010, 2012), 50.87 (2008), 50.89 (2008), 50.90 (2009).
Rafael Muñoz also swam 50.46 (2009), 50.58 (2009), 50.59 (2009), 50.85 (2009).
Shaine Casas also swam 50.56 (2022), 50.80 (2023), 50.86 (2022).
Chad le Clos also swam 50.65 (2018).
Ian Crocker also swam 50.76 (2004), 50.82 (2007).
Noè Ponti also swam 50.76 (2021), 50.87 (2022).
Joseph Schooling also swam 50.78 (2017), 50.83 (2016, 2017).
Albert Subirats also swam 50.79 (2009).
James Guy also swam 50.83 (2017).
Jason Dunford also swam 50.85 (2009).
Naoki Mizunuma also swam 50.86 (2022).
László Cseh also swam 50.87 (2015), 50.91 (2015), 50.92 (2017).
Mehdy Metella also swam 50.87 (2021).
Andrey Minakov also swam 50.88 (2021).
Michael Andrew also swam 50.88 (2022).
Andrew Lauterstein also swam 50.92 (2009).
Matthew Temple also swam 50.92 (2021).

Men short course
Correct as of December 2022

Notes
Below is a list of other times equal or superior to 49.49:
Chad le Clos also swam 48.44 (2014), 48.45 (2020), 48.50 (2018), 48.56 (2014), 48.58 (2022), 48.59 (2014, 2022), 48.66 (2016), 48.70 (2014), 48.74 (2014), 48.82 (2012), 48.85 (2022), 48.95 (2014), 48.98 (2022), 48.99 (2014), 49.01 (2013, 2016), 49.03 (2021), 49.04 (2021), 49.05 (2013, 2016), 49.08 (2013), 49.09 (2017), 49.13 (2017), 49.14 (2013, 2016, 2020), 49.15 (2019), 49.18 (2017), 49.22 (2018), 49.26 (2016), 49.27 (2021), 49.33 (2020), 49.34 (2013, 2019), 49.35 (2016), 49.39 (2020), 49.41 (2013), 49.45 (2016), 49.48 (2013, 2020), 49.49 (2017).
Caeleb Dressel also swam 48.53 (2021), 48.71 (2018, 2021), 48.92 (2020), 49.02 (2020), 49.03 (2021), 49.10 (2019), 49.16 (2019), 49.23 (2021), 49.33 (2020), 49.35 (2020).
Tom Shields also swam 48.63 (2015), 48.67 (2021), 48.78 (2021), 48.80 (2013), 48.83 (2021), 48.88 (2021), 48.90 (2021), 48.94 (2020), 48.99 (2014, 2021), 49.00 (2014), 49.01 (2013, 2020), 49.02 (2014), 49.03 (2021), 49.04 (2016), 49.16 (2013), 49.17 (2020), 49.20 (2021), 49.23 (2014), 49.30 (2020), 49.32 (2013, 2014), 49.36 (2021), 49.39 (2019), 49.45 (2013), 49.46 (2021), 49.47 (2021), 49.49 (2013).
Matteo Rivolta also swam 48.87 (2021), 49.05 (2021), 49.07 (2021, 2022), 49.32 (2022), 49.43 (2022).
Yevgeny Korotyshkin also swam 48.93 (2009), 48.99 (2009), 49.43 (2013), 49.49 (2009).
Noè Ponti also swam 49.07 (2022), 49.25 (2022), 49.38 (2021), 49.49 (2021).
Marius Kusch also swam 49.12 (2022), 49.20 (2022), 49.48 (2020), 49.49 (2021).
Li Zhuhao also swam 49.36 (2018).

Women long course
Correct as of March 2023

Notes
Below is a list of other times equal or superior to 56.89:
Sarah Sjöström also swam 55.53 (2017), 55.64 (2015), 55.68 (2016), 55.74 (2015), 55.76 (2017), 55.77 (2017), 55.84 (2016), 55.89 (2016), 55.95 (2016), 55.96 (2017), 56.04 (2015), 56.06 (2009), 56.12 (2016), 56.18 (2021), 56.20 (2017), 56.22 (2019), 56.23 (2018), 56.26 (2016, 2017), 56.29 (2018, 2019), 56.32 (2017), 56.35 (2018), 56.37 (2016), 56.38 (2016), 56.40 (2021), 56.42 (2019), 56.44 (2009), 56.45 (2019, 2019), 56.46 (2018), 56.47 (2015), 56.50 (2014), 56.52 (2014), 56.53 (2013, 2014, 2017), 56.57 (2018), 56.58 (2015), 56.62 (2018), 56.66 (2018), 56.69 (2019), 56.70 (2022), 56.71 (2020), 56.72 (2016), 56.76 (2009), 56.77 (2018), 56.78 (2019), 56.79 (2012), 56.83 (2018), 56.86 (2019), 56.87 (2018).
Zhang Yufei also swam 55.64 (2021), 55.73 (2021), 55.82 (2021), 55.89 (2021), 55.96 (2021), 56.06 (2021), 56.18 (2021), 56.24 (2021), 56.29 (2020), 56.40 (2021), 56.41 (2022), 56.42 (2021), 56.47 (2020), 56.49 (2022), 56.56 (2022), 56.68 (2020).
Torri Huske also swam 55.66 (2021), 55.73 (2021), 55.78 (2021), 56.28 (2022), 56.29 (2021, 2022), 56.51 (2021), 56.69 (2021, 2021), 56.82 (2022).
Emma McKeon also swam 55.82 (2021), 55.93 (2021), 56.18 (2017), 56.23 (2017), 56.33 (2021), 56.36 (2020), 56.38 (2022), 56.44 (2021), 56.54 (2018), 56.61 (2018, 2019), 56.65 (2021), 56.69 (2020), 56.78 (2018), 56.81 (2016, 2017, 2021), 56.82 (2021), 56.85 (2019), 56.89 (2016).
Maggie MacNeil also swam 55.83 (2019), 56.14 (2021), 56.19 (2021), 56.36 (2022), 56.52 (2019), 56.55 (2021), 56.56 (2021), 56.70 (2021).
Marie Wattel also swam 56.16 (2021), 56.27 (2021), 56.80 (2022, 2022).
Rikako Ikee also swam 56.23 (2018), 56.30 (2018), 56.40 (2018), 56.86 (2016), 56.89 (2017, 2017).
Dana Vollmer also swam 56.25 (2012), 56.36 (2012), 56.42 (2012), 56.47 (2011), 56.50 (2012), 56.56 (2016), 56.59 (2012), 56.63 (2016), 56.87 (2011).
Claire Curzan also swam 56.35 (2022), 56.43 (2021, 2021), 56.61 (2020), 56.74 (2022), 56.81 (2021), 56.89 (2022).
Kelsi Dahlia also swam 56.44 (2017, 2018), 56.48 (2016), 56.56 (2021), 56.74 (2017), 56.80 (2021), 56.83 (2018), 56.84 (2016), 56.86 (2018).
Louise Hansson also swam 56.48 (2022), 56.66 (2022), 56.73 (2021, 2021), 56.89 (2022).
Inge de Bruijn also swam 56.64 (2000), 56.69 (2000).
Penny Oleksiak also swam 56.73 (2016).
Libby Trickett also swam 56.81 (2008).
Chen Xinyi also swam 56.82 (2016).
Jeanette Ottesen also swam 56.83 (2016).
Lu Ying also swam 56.87 (2012).

Women short course
Correct as of December 2022

Notes
Below is a list of other times equal or superior to 55.74:
Maggie Mac Neil also swam 54.78 (2022), 55.04 (2021), 55.30 (2021), 55.45 (2021).
Kelsi Dahlia also swam 54.84 (2018), 55.01 (2018), 55.21 (2018), 55.22 (2016, 2021), 55.35 (2019), 55.40 (2021), 55.49 (2016), 55.54 (2021), 55.55 (2020), 55.63 (2021), 55.64 (2020), 55.72 (2020).
Sarah Sjöström also swam 54.91 (2018), 54.96 (2018), 55.00 (2017), 55.03 (2015), 55.07 (2017), 55.13 (2014), 55.32 (2017), 55.35 (2020), 55.37 (2020), 55.44 (2020), 55.55 (2017), 55.60 (2017), 55.70 (2017).
Louise Hansson also swam 55.02 (2022), 55.26 (2021), 55.33 (2022), 55.42 (2021), 55.49 (2021), 55.67 (2021, 2022), 55.74 (2022).
Torri Huske also swam 55.23 (2022).
Emma McKeon also swam 55.63 (2021), 55.66 (2021).
Claire Curzan also swam 55.64 (2021).

References
  International Swimming Hall of Fame – archived from the ISHOF original
  Zwemkroniek
  Agenda Diana

Butterfly 100 metres
World record progression 100 metres butterfly